The 65th annual Berlin International Film Festival was held from 5 to 15 February 2015, with American film director Darren Aronofsky as the President of the Jury. German film director Wim Wenders was presented with the Honorary Golden Bear. The first seven films of the festival were announced on 15 December 2014. Isabel Coixet's Nobody Wants the Night was announced as the opening film.

The Iranian drama film Taxi, directed by Jafar Panahi, won the Golden Bear, which also served as the closing film of the festival.

For the first time in 2015, a "Berlin Critics' Week" ran parallel to the official festival. Similar to International Critics' Week at the Cannes festival, Berlin Critics' Week (alternatively referred to as "Critics' Week Berlin") is a sidebar run by the German Film Critics Association and screens arthouse films.

Jury

Main Competition
The following people were on the jury for the festival:

International jury
 Darren Aronofsky, film director, screenwriter and producer (United States) - Jury President
 Daniel Brühl, actor (Germany)
 Bong Joon-ho, director and screenwriter (South Korea)
 Martha De Laurentiis, film producer (United States)
 Claudia Llosa, film director, screenwriter and producer (Peru)
 Audrey Tautou, actress (France)
 Matthew Weiner, director, screenwriter and producer (United States)

First Feature Award Jury
The following people were on the jury for the Best First Feature:
 Fernando Eimbcke, film director and screenwriter (Mexico)
 Olga Kurylenko, actress (Ukraine)
 Joshua Oppenheimer, film director (United States)

International Short Film Jury
The following people were on the jury for the Best Short Film:
 Halil Altındere, artist (Turkey)
 Madhusree Dutta, director, curator and author (India)
 Wahyuni A. Hadi, author and curator (Singapore)

In competition
The following films were selected for the main competition for the Golden Bear and Silver Bear awards:

Out of competition
The following films were selected to be screened out of competition:

Panorama
The following films were selected for the Panorama section:

Berlinale Special
The following films were selected for the Berlinale Special section:

Berlinale Classics
The following films were selected to be screened in the Berlinale Classics section:

Berlinale Series

The Series section, devoted to longform television series, was introduced in 2015.

Better Call Saul had its premiere at the Berlinale.

Awards

The following prizes were awarded:
 Golden Bear – Taxi by Jafar Panahi
 Silver Bear Grand Jury Prize – The Club by Pablo Larraín
 Alfred Bauer Prize (Silver Bear) – Ixcanul by Jayro Bustamante
 Silver Bear for Best Director
Radu Jude for Aferim!
Małgorzata Szumowska for Body
 Silver Bear for Best Actress – Charlotte Rampling for 45 Years
 Silver Bear for Best Actor – Tom Courtenay for 45 Years
 Silver Bear for Best Script – Patricio Guzmán for The Pearl Button
 Silver Bear for Outstanding Artistic Contribution for Cinematography
Sturla Brandth Grøvlen for Victoria
Sergey Mikhalchuk and Evgeniy Privin for Under Electric Clouds
 Best First Feature Award – 600 Miles by Gabriel Ripstein
Panoroma Audience Award
1st Place: The Second Mother by Anna Muylaert
2nd Place: Stories of Our Lives by Jim Chuchu
3rd Place: Tough Love by Rosa von Praunheim
Generation
The Grand Prix, for the best feature-length film
Special Mention for the Best Feature Film by The Children's Jury for Generation Kplus 
 Rainbow by Nagesh Kukunoor
 Teddy Award: Nasty Baby by Sebastián Silva
 FIPRESCI Prize
 Competition: Taxi by Jafar Panahi
 Panorama: A Minor Leap Down by Hamed Rajabi

Festival appearance
The festival poster was designed by BOROS agency, who made the previous four posters of the festival. Festival director Dieter Kosslick described the poster as "the glamorous and suspense-packed second that precedes every cinema experience is when the curtain opens to reveal the screen. This year's poster motif aims to stir anticipation for that magical moment".

References

External links

65
2015 film festivals
2015 festivals in Europe
2015 in Berlin
Berl